Kirix Strata is a specialty web browser designed for data analytics.  Strata offers a browser's ability to view web pages, but also includes additional tools to perform data analysis and create reports based on structured data from local files, external relational databases and the Web.

The browser incorporates Mozilla's XULRunner into a proprietary data engine to create a rich web application for working with data. Kirix Strata is a free, open source product that uses the cross-platform wxWidgets toolkit and is supported on both Microsoft Windows and Linux.

History

Kirix Research is a data analysis software company founded in January 2001 by four brothers and a friend.  In its early years the company specialized in identifying duplicate payments and other overpayment errors in large corporate accounting systems.

In February 2005, Kirix launched Kirix Strata as a new desktop database for Windows and Linux at the LinuxWorld conference in Boston.  The product combined some of the capabilities of a spreadsheet with those of a database management system and won the Product Excellence Award in the Best Desktop-Productivity-Business Application category.

In July 2007, Kirix relaunched Strata in beta as a specialty browser for working with data from anywhere, including from the Web.  The beta product took the database features of the previously released version and incorporated the Mozilla Gecko layout engine to provide Web connectivity.  Strata was officially released out of beta in April 2008 with the intention of bringing the simplicity of a web browser to the world of tabular data.  Because of the web connectivity and the user-centric analytic features, Strata can also be considered a productivity tool for Business Intelligence 2.0.

Features

As with other browsers such as Google Chrome and Mozilla Firefox, Kirix Strata provides tools to view and interact with web pages.  However, it deviates by focusing on manipulating and interacting with structured data:

 Data Access: Web data (e.g., HTML tables, RSS feeds, CSV files), external databases (e.g., MySQL, Oracle) and local data files (e.g., Excel, Access, text-delimited data).
 Data Analysis: Sorts, filters, copies, queries, calculated fields and relationships.
 Reporting
 Scripting and Extensions: Data-enabled version of JavaScript with support for SQL.
 Operating system support:
 Microsoft Windows 7/10/11
 Ubuntu Linux 10.04 and later (discontinued in October 2012)
 supports up to 18 exabytes per project; 60 billion records per table; 250 million table per project.

References

Web browsers
Data analysis software
Software that uses wxWidgets